Fire and Steel may refer to:

 Fire & Steel – Blades, Arms and Awesomeness, a Canadian supplier for theatrical and cosplay props
 Working with Fire and Steel – Possible Pop Songs Volume Two,a 1983 album by China Crisis
 Fire and Steel (film), a 1927 American silent action film
 Fire & Steel, a 1978 board game